Marguerite Germaine Marie Donnadieu (4 April 1914 – 3 March 1996), known as Marguerite Duras, was a French novelist, playwright, screenwriter, essayist, and experimental filmmaker. Her script for the film Hiroshima mon amour (1959) earned her a nomination for Best Original Screenplay at the Academy Awards.

Early life and education
Duras was born Marguerite Donnadieu on 4 April 1914, in Gia Định, Cochinchina, French Indochina (now Vietnam). Her parents, Marie (née Legrand, 1877–1956) and Henri Donnadieu (1872–1921), were teachers from France who likely had met at Gia Định High School. They both had previous marriages. Marguerite had two older brothers: Pierre, the elder, and Paul.

Duras' father fell ill and he returned to France, where he died in 1921. Between 1922 and 1924, the family lived in France while her mother was on administrative leave. They then moved back to French Indochina when she was posted to Phnom Penh followed by Vĩnh Long and Sa Đéc. The family struggled financially, and her mother made a bad investment in an isolated property and area of rice farmland in Prey Nob, a story which was fictionalized in Un barrage contre le Pacifique (The Sea Wall).

In 1931, when she was 17, Duras and her family moved to France where she successfully passed the first part of the baccalaureate with the choice of Vietnamese as a foreign language, as she spoke it fluently. Duras returned to Saigon in late 1932 where her mother found a teaching post. There, Marguerite continued her education at the Lycée Chasseloup-Laubat and completed the second part of the baccalaureate, specializing in philosophy.

In autumn 1933, Duras moved to Paris, graduating with a degree in public law in 1936. At the same time, she took classes in mathematics.  She continued her education, earning a diplôme d'études supérieures (DES) in public law and, later, in political economy. After finishing her studies in 1937, she found employment with the French government at the Ministry of the Colonies. In 1939, she married the writer Robert Antelme, whom she had met during her studies.

During World War II, from 1942 to 1944, Duras worked for the Vichy government in an office that allocated paper quotas to publishers and in the process operated a de facto book-censorship system. She also became an active member of the PCF (the French Communist Party) and a member of the French Resistance as a part of a small group that also included François Mitterrand, who later became President of France and remained a lifelong friend of hers. Duras' husband, Antelme, was deported to Buchenwald in 1944 for his involvement in the Resistance, and barely survived the experience (weighing on his release, according to Duras, just 38 kg, or 84 pounds). She nursed him back to health, but they divorced once he recovered.

In 1943, when publishing her first novel, she began to use the surname Duras, after the town that her father came from, Duras, Lot-et-Garonne.

In 1950, her mother returned to France from Indochina, wealthy from property investments and from the boarding school she had run.

Career
Duras was the author of many novels, plays, films, interviews, essays, and works of short fiction, including her best-selling, highly fictionalized autobiographical work L'Amant (1984), translated into English as The Lover, which describes her youthful affair with a Chinese-Vietnamese man. It won the Prix Goncourt in 1984. The story of her adolescence also appears in three other books: The Sea Wall, Eden Cinema and The North China Lover. A film version of The Lover, produced by Claude Berri and directed by Jean-Jacques Annaud, was released in 1992. Duras's novel The Sea Wall was first adapted into the 1958 film This Angry Age by René Clément, and again in 2008 by Cambodian director Rithy Panh as The Sea Wall.

Other major works include Moderato Cantabile (1958), which was the basis of the 1960 film Seven Days... Seven Nights; Le Ravissement de Lol V. Stein (1964); and her play India Song, which Duras herself later directed as a film in 1975. She was also the screenwriter of the 1959 French film Hiroshima mon amour, which was directed by Alain Resnais. Duras's early novels were fairly conventional in form, and were criticized for their "romanticism" by fellow writer Raymond Queneau; however, with Moderato Cantabile, she became more experimental, paring down her texts to give ever-increasing importance to what was not said. She was associated with the nouveau roman French literary movement, although she did not belong definitively to any one group. She was noted for her command of dialogue.

In 1971, Duras signed the Manifesto of the 343, thereby publicly announcing that she had had an abortion.

According to literature and film scholars Madeleine Cottenet-Hage and Robert P. Kolker, Duras' provocative cinema between 1973 and 1983 was concerned with a single "ideal" image, at the same time both "an absolute vacant image and an absolute meaningful image," while also focused on the verbal text. They said her films purposely lacked realistic representation, such as divorcing image from sound and using space symbolically.

Many of her works, such as Le Ravissement de Lol V. Stein and L'Homme assis dans le couloir (1980), deal with human sexuality.

Towards the end of her life, Duras published a short, 54-page autobiographical book as a goodbye to her readers and family. The last entry was written on 1 August 1995 and read "I think it is all over. That my life is finished. I am no longer anything. I have become an appalling sight. I am falling apart. Come quickly. I no longer have a mouth, no longer a face". Duras died at her home in Paris on 3 March 1996, aged 81.

Personal life
During the latter stages of World War II she experienced separation from her husband Robert Antelme owing to his imprisonment in Buchenwald. She wrote La Douleur during his captivity. While married to Antelme, Duras acted on her belief that fidelity was absurd. She created a ménage à trois when she started an affair with the writer Dionys Mascolo, who fathered her son Jean Mascolo.

During the final two decades of Duras' life, she experienced various health problems. Starting in 1980 she was hospitalized for the first time, from a combination of alcohol and tranquilizers. She was also undergoing various detoxification procedures to help her recover from her alcohol addiction. After being hospitalized in October 1988 she fell into a coma that lasted until June 1989.

Paralleling her health problems in the 1980s, Duras began having a relationship with a homosexual actor named Yann Andréa. Yann Andréa helped Duras through her health difficulties. Duras would later detail these interactions and companionship in her final book Yann Andréa Steiner.

Duras' health continued to decline into the 1990s, resulting in her death on 3 March 1996.

Reception and legacy 
Samuel Beckett regarded first hearing the radio play "The Square" as a significant moment in his life.

In 1992, after a dinner with friends where Marguerite Duras was dismissed as the most overrated author of the moment, the journalist Étienne de Montety copied L'Après-midi de Monsieur Andesmas, a relatively minor work of Duras from 1962, by only changing the names of the characters in the text and replacing the title with "Margot et l'important". He sent the result under the alias "Guillaume P. Jacquet" to the three main publishers of Duras: Gallimard, POL and Éditions de Minuit. Éditions de Minuit replied to Guillaume P. Jacquet that "[his] manuscript unfortunately cannot be included in [their] publications"; Gallimard that "the verdict is not favourable"; and POL that "[the] book does not correspond to what [they] are looking for their collections". The facsimile of the refusal letters was published in the Figaro littéraire under the title "Marguerite Duras refusée par ses propres éditeurs" ("Marguerite Duras refused by her own publishers").

The 2021 French mini-series Une affaire française (aka A French Case) depicts Duras (played by a chain-smoking Dominique Blanc) in a damning light, as she insinuates herself into the investigation of a 1984 child murder case by accusing the mother of the crime.

Awards and honors 

 Prix de Mai 1958 for Moderato cantabile.
 Prix de la Tribune de Paris 1962 for L'Après-midi de Monsieur Andesmas.
 Sélection à la Mostra de Venise 1972 for the film Nathalie Granger.
 Prix de l'Association française des cinémas d'art et d'essai 1975 for India Song.
 Prix Jean-Cocteau 1976 for the film Des journées entières dans les arbres.
 Grand prix du théâtre de l'Académie française 1983.
 Prix Goncourt 1984 for L'Amant.
 Prix Ritz-Paris-Hemingway for L'Amant

Bibliography
Novels and stories

 Les Impudents (Plon, 1943)
La Vie tranquille (Gallimard, 1944)
Un barrage contre le Pacifique (Gallimard, 1950). The Sea Wall, trans. Herma Briffault (1952). Also translated by Antonia White as A Sea of Troubles (1953)
Le Marin de Gibraltar (Gallimard, 1952). The Sailor from Gibraltar, trans. Barbara Bray (1966)
Les Petits Chevaux de Tarquinia (Gallimard, 1953). The Little Horses of Tarquinia, trans. Peter DuBerg (1960)
Des journées entières dans les arbres (Gallimard, 1954). Whole Days in the Trees, trans. Anita Barrows (1984). Includes three other novellas: "Le Boa", "Madame Dodin", "Les Chantiers"
Le Square (Gallimard, 1955). The Square, trans. Sonia Pitt-Rivers and Irina Morduch (1959)
Moderato cantabile (Les Éditions de Minuit, 1958). Moderato cantabile, trans. Richard Seaver (1960)
 Dix heures et demie du soir en été (Paris, 1960). Ten-Thirty on a Summer Night, trans. Anne Borchardt (1961)
 L'Après-midi de M. Andesmas (Gallimard, 1962). The Afternoon of Mr. Andesmas, trans. Anne Borchardt and Barbara Bray (1964)
 Le Ravissement de Lol V. Stein (Gallimard, 1964). The Ravishing of Lol Stein, trans. Richard Seaver (1964)
 Le Vice-Consul (Gallimard, 1965). The Vice-Consul, trans. Eileen Ellenborgener (1968)
 L'Amante anglaise (fr) (Gallimard, 1967). L'Amante anglaise, trans. Barbara Bray (1968)
 Détruire, dit-elle (Les Éditions de Minuit, 1969). Destroy, She Said, trans. Barbara Bray (1970)
 Abahn Sabana David (Gallimard, 1970)
Ah! Ernesto (Hatlin Quist, 1971)
 L'Amour (Gallimard, 1972). L'Amour, trans. Kazim Ali and Libby Murphy (2013)
 Vera Baxter ou les Plages de l'Atlantique (Albatros, 1980)
 L'Homme assis dans le couloir (Les Éditions de Minuit, 1980). The Man Sitting in the Corridor, trans. Barbara Bray (1991)
 L'Homme atlantique (Les Éditions de Minuit, 1982). The Atlantic Man, trans. Alberto Manguel (1993)
 La Maladie de la mort (Les Éditions de Minuit, 1982). The Malady of Death, trans. Barbara Bray (1986)
 L'Amant (Les Éditions de Minuit, 1984). The Lover, trans. Barbara Bray (1985). Awarded the 1984 Prix Goncourt.
 La Douleur (POL, 1985). The War, trans. Barbara Bray (1986)
 Les Yeux bleus, Cheveux noirs (Les Éditions de Minuit, 1986). Blue Eyes, Black Hair, trans. Barbara Bray (1987)
 La Pute de la côte normande (Les Éditions de Minuit, 1986). The Slut of the Normandy Coast, trans. Alberto Manguel (1993)
 Emily L. (Les Éditions de Minuit, 1987). Emily L., trans. Barbara Bray (1989)
 La Pluie d'été (POL, 1990). Summer Rain, trans. Barbara Bray (1992)
 L'Amant de la Chine du Nord (Gallimard, 1991). The North China Lover, trans. Leigh Hafrey (1992)
 Yann Andréa Steiner (Gallimard, 1992). Yann Andrea Steiner, trans. Barbara Bray (1993)
  Écrire (Gallimard, 1993). Writing, trans. Mark Polizzotti (2011)

Collections

 L'Été 80 (Les Éditions de Minuit, 1980)
 Outside (Albin Michel, 1981). Outside, trans. Arthur Goldhammer (1986)
 La Vie matérielle (POL, 1987). Practicalities, trans. Barbara Bray (1990)
 Les Yeux verts (Cahiers du cinéma, n.312–313, June 1980 and a new edition, 1987). Green Eyes, trans. Carol Barko (1990)
C'est tout (POL, 1995). No More, trans. Richard Howard (1998)

Theatre

 Les Viaducs de la Seine et Oise (Gallimard, 1959). The Viaducts of Seine-et-Oise, trans. Barbara Bray, in Three Plays (1967)
Théâtre I: Les Eaux et Forêts; Le Square; La Musica (Gallimard, 1965)
The Square, trans. Barbara Bray and Sonia Orwell, in Three Plays (1967)
La Musica, trans. Barbara Bray (1975)
L'Amante anglaise (Gallimard, 1968). L'Amante anglaise, trans. Barbara Bray (1975)
 Théâtre II: Suzanna Andler; Des journées entières dans les arbres; Yes, peut-être; Le Shaga; Un homme est venu me voir (Gallimard, 1968)
Suzanna Andler, trans. Barbara Bray (1975)
Days in the Trees, trans. Barbara Bray and Sonia Orwell, in Three Plays (1967)
 India Song (Gallimard, 1973). India Song, trans. Barbara Bray (1976)
 L'Eden Cinéma (Mercure de France, 1977). Eden Cinema, trans. Barbara Bray, in Four Plays (1992)
 Agatha (Les Éditions de Minuit, 1981). Agatha, trans. Howard Limoli (1992)
 Savannah Bay (Les Éditions de Minuit, 1982; revised, 1983). Savannah Bay, trans. Barbara Bray, in Four Plays (1992); also by Howard Limoli (1992)
 Théâtre III: La Bête dans la jungle; Les Papiers d'Aspern; La Danse de mort (Gallimard, 1984)
 La Musica deuxième (Gallimard, 1985). La Musica deuxième, trans. Barbara Bray, in Four Plays (1992)

Screenplays
Hiroshima mon amour (Gallimard, 1960). Hiroshima mon amour, trans. Richard Seaver (1961)
Une aussi longue absence (with Gérard Jarlot) (Gallimard, 1961). Une aussi longue absence, trans. Barbara Wright (1961)
Nathalie Granger, suivi de La Femme du Gange (Gallimard, 1973)
Le Camion, suivi de Entretien avec Michelle Porte (Les Éditions de Minuit, 1977). The Darkroom, trans. Alta Ifland and Eireene Nealand (Contra Mundum Press, 2021)
Le Navire Night, suivi de Cesarée, les Mains négatives, Aurélia Steiner (Mercure de France, 1979). The Ship "Night", trans. Susan Dwyer

Filmography

Director
 La Musica (1967)
 Détruire, dit-elle (1969)
 Jaune le soleil (1972)
 Nathalie Granger (1972)
 La Femme du Gange (1974)
 India Song (1975)
 Son nom de Venise dans Calcutta désert (1976)
 Des journées entières dans les arbres (1976)
 Le Camion (1977)
 Baxter, Vera Baxter (1977)
 Les Mains négatives (1978)
 Césarée (1978)
 Le Navire Night (1979)
 Aurelia Steiner (Melbourne) (1979)
 Aurélia Steiner (Vancouver) (1979)
 Agatha et les lectures illimitées (1981)
 L'Homme atlantique (1981)
 Il dialogo di Roma (1982)
 Les Enfants (1985)

Actor
 India Song (1975) – (voice)
 The Lorry (1977) – Elle
 Baxter, Vera Baxter (1977) – Narrator (voice, uncredited)
 Le Navire Night (1979) – (voice)
 Aurélia Steiner (Vancouver) (1979) – Narrator (voice)
 Agatha et les Lectures illimitées (1981) – (voice)
 Les Enfants (1985) – Narration (voice, uncredited) (final film role)

References

Further reading
 .
 
 
  .
  .
 Adler, Laure. (1998), Marguerite Duras: A Life, Trans. Anne-Marie Glasheen, London: Orion Books.
  .
 
Selous, Trista (1988), The Other Woman: Feminism and Feminity in the Work of Marguerite Duras, New Haven: Yale University Press. .

External links

 
 Edmund White, "In Love with Duras", The New York Review of Books, 26 June 2008
 Emilie Bickerton, "The Timeless Marguerite Duras", The Times Literary Supplement, 25 July 2007
 Hélène Volat, Marguerite Duras on-line bibliography
 Difference and Repetition: The Filmmaking of Marguerite Duras

 
1914 births
1996 deaths
People from Ho Chi Minh City
French women novelists
French memoirists
French erotica writers
French women screenwriters
French Resistance members
French communists
French women dramatists and playwrights
French women film directors
French women memoirists
French Communist writers
French people in colonial Vietnam
Postmodern writers
Women erotica writers
Communist members of the French Resistance
Signatories of the 1971 Manifesto of the 343
Prix Goncourt winners
Deaths from esophageal cancer
Deaths from cancer in France
Burials at Montparnasse Cemetery
20th-century French women writers
20th-century French novelists
20th-century French dramatists and playwrights
20th-century French screenwriters
20th-century memoirists